Maslovka is a rural locality (a selo) in Nizhneikoretskoye Rural Settlement, Liskinsky District, Voronezh Oblast, Russia. The population was 234 as of 2010.

Geography 
Maslovka is located 24 km east of Liski (the district's administrative centre) by road. Solontsy is the nearest rural locality.

References 

Rural localities in Liskinsky District